Lourival Fontes (July 20, 1899 – March 6, 1967) was a Brazilian journalist and politician best known for being the propaganda minister for President Getúlio Vargas between 1934 and 1942. He was born in Riachão do Dantas, Sergipe and married the poet Adalgisa Nery in 1940. He also served as the Ambassador of Brazil to Mexico.

References

1899 births
1967 deaths
Brazilian journalists
Government ministers of Brazil
Ambassadors of Brazil to Mexico
20th-century journalists